Andreas Morisbak (born 19 May 1940) is a Norwegian former football player and manager. A defender and midfielder, he notable played for FK Lyn in the 1960s. He is the father of the footballer Sven Morisbak

Career
Morisbak was born in Vefsn, and moved with his family to Børsa as a young child. He played for the clubs Børsa and Orkanger IF, before moving to Oslo where he played for FK Lyn from 1960 to 1971. He played 221 matches and scored five goals for Lyn. He captained the team that won the Double in 1968.

Morisbak was capped three times for Norway national team in 1968 and 1969.

He was the head coach of Lyn from 1972 to 1974 and had a short spell as head coach at Viking FK in 1983. From 1987 to 1988, when Tord Grip was manager of the Norway national football team, Morisbak was appointed assistant manager.

He has a degree from the Norwegian School of Sport Sciences, and has been employed by the Football Association of Norway, managing the national youth teams, as well as being in overall charge of youth development from 1975 to 2006.

Honours

As player
FK Lyn
 Norwegian First Division: 1964, 1968; runner-up 1963, 1965
 Norwegian Football Cup: 1967, 1968; runner-up 1966, 1970

References

External links 
 
 

1940 births
Living people
People from Vefsn
Norwegian footballers
Association football defenders
Association football midfielders
Norway international footballers
Lyn Fotball players
Norwegian football managers
Norway national football team managers
Viking FK managers
Lyn Fotball managers
Norwegian non-fiction writers